Floyd Mack Rhea (1920-2010) was a professional American football player who played offensive lineman for six seasons for the Chicago Cardinals, Brooklyn Tigers, Boston Yanks, and Detroit Lions.

References

1920 births
American football offensive guards
American football centers
Detroit Lions players
Chicago Cardinals players
Boston Yanks players
Brooklyn Tigers players
Oregon Ducks football players
People from Washington County, Arkansas
Players of American football from Arkansas
2010 deaths

Rhea was a standout athlete at Fullerton Union High School.